Feeria is a genus  of plants in the family Campanulaceae. There is only one known species, Feeria angustifolia, endemic to Morocco.

References

External links

Campanuloideae
Flora of Morocco
Monotypic Campanulaceae genera